Lake Murray is a reservoir in San Diego, California, operated by the City of San Diego's Public Utilities Department. It is located within Mission Trails Regional Park. The asphalt-paved service road lining roughly two-thirds of the lake's perimeter is a popular recreation site for the Navajo community. It lies south of Cowles Mountain and is an important reporting point for aircraft inbound to land at Montgomery-Gibbs Executive Airport (identifier: KMYF).

History
The reservoir was formed in 1894 with the construction of an earthen dam, and was known as La Mesa Reservoir. In 1910 the dam and reservoir were bought by Ed Fletcher as part of his Cuyamaca Water Company. Following the great San Diego County flooding in 1916 (associated with the rainmaker Charles Hatfield), the reservoir was the principal source of water for the city of San Diego. In 1919, the dam was enlarged and the capacity of the reservoir greatly expanded. The dam and lake were renamed in 1924 after James A. Murray, one of Fletcher's investors in the water company. Fletcher sold the Cuyamaca Water Company, including Lake Murray, to the La Mesa, Lemon Grove and Spring Valley Irrigation District in 1926. The city of San Diego took over operation of the reservoir in 1950, and purchased the reservoir in 1960.

Ecology 

At least 149 species of birds have been observed and recorded at Lake Murray. Among other species, the lake supports flocks of the endangered tricolored blackbird. The reservoir also has Florida-strain largemouth bass, bluegill, channel catfish, black crappie, and trout (stocked November–May).

The area also contains many endemic or naturalized plant species which include: Baccharis sarothroides, encelia californica, eriogonum fasciculatum, agave attenuata (Foxtail agave), opuntia littoralis (Coastal prickly pear), ferocactus viridescens (San Diego barrel cactus), pseudognaphalium californicum, datura wrightii (Sacred datura), artemisia californica, malosma laurina, ambrosia deltoidea, corymbia citriodora, schinus molle (Peruvian peppertree), hesperoyucca whipplei, tamarix ramosissima, centaurea melitensis, calystegia macrostegia, adenostoma fasciculatum, euphorbia peplus, ricinus communis, hirschfeldia incana, crocanthemum scoparium, rumex crispus, carduus pycnocephalus, carpobrotus edulis, schoenoplectus californicus (California bulrush), myoporum laetum, salix nigra, foeniculum vulgare, callistemon citrinus and schinus terebinthifolia among others.

Recreational usage 
Lake Murray is a popular site for hikers, cyclists, and runners who travel around the periphery of the lake.

Kayaking and catch-and-release fishing are both allowed on the reservoir. Birdwatchers enjoy visiting Lake Murray where ducks, geese, and herons abound. At least 149 bird species have been observed and recorded here.

Lake Murray is open for shore fishing and private boats, kayaks, and float tubes seven days a week from 5:30 a.m. to about sunset but changes throughout the year. On days or times when the concession is closed, patrons can purchase permits from the iron ranger boxes (envelope system) at the lake. The reservoir is stocked with Florida-strain largemouth bass, bluegill, channel catfish, black crappie, and trout. Fish limits are five trout, five bass, five catfish, and twenty-five crappie and bluegill in aggregate, with no limit on other species. Anglers 16 years of age or older must have a California state fishing license. Fish catch information is weekly.

See also
 Mission Trails Regional Park
 List of lakes in California

References

External links 

City of San Diego - Reservoirs - Murray Reservoir
Bird Friends of Lake Murray & San Diego

Murray
Geography of San Diego
San Diego River
Murray
Murray
1894 establishments in California